Goran Siljanovski (born 1 July 1990 in Tetovo) is a Macedonian professional footballer who plays as a right-back for Dinamo Tirana and Macedonian national team.

Club career
On 14 June 2017, Siljanovski moved for the first time aboard to sign with Albanian Superliga side Flamurtari Vlorë.

International career
Siljanovski made his senior debut on 18 June 2014 in a friendly against China, playing the first half as the match finished in a 2–0 defeat.

Honours
Rabotnički
Macedonian First Football League: 2013–14
Macedonian Football Cup: 2013–14, 2014–15

Renova
Macedonian Football Cup: 2011–12

References

External links
 
 

1990 births
Living people
Sportspeople from Tetovo
Association football fullbacks
Macedonian footballers
North Macedonia under-21 international footballers
North Macedonia international footballers
FK Makedonija Gjorče Petrov players
FK Vardar players
FK Teteks players
FK Renova players
FK Rabotnički players
Flamurtari Vlorë players
Macedonian First Football League players
Kategoria Superiore players
Macedonian expatriate footballers
Expatriate footballers in Albania
Macedonian expatriate sportspeople in Albania